The General Assembly, the legislature of the U.S. state of Georgia, has convened many times since statehood became effective on January 2, 1778.

Legislatures

Constitutional Conventions
 Georgia Constitutional Convention of 1776
 Georgia Constitutional Convention of 1789
 Georgia Constitutional Convention of 1798
 Georgia Constitutional Convention of 1861
 Georgia Constitutional Convention of 1865
 Georgia Constitutional Convention of 1867–1868
 Georgia Constitutional Convention of 1877
 Georgia Constitutional Commission of 1945
 Select Committee on Constitutional Revision (1977-1981)

References

Legislatures
Legislature
 
Georgia
Georgia
Georgia